The men's team Nordic combined competition for the 1992 Winter Olympics in Albertville was held at Courchevel and Les Saisies on 16 and 17 February.

Results

Ski jumping
Each of the three team members performed three jumps, with the top two scores counting. The scores for each team were combined and used to calculate their deficit in the cross-country skiing portion of the event. Each point difference between teams in the ski jumping portion in this event resulted in a six second difference in the cross country part of the event.

Cross-country

Each member of the team completed a ten kilometre cross-country skiing leg.

References

External links
 Sports-Reference - 1992 Nordic Combined Men's team

Nordic combined at the 1992 Winter Olympics